Topolovec ( or ) is a small settlement in the Municipality of Šmarje pri Jelšah in eastern Slovenia. It lies just west of the regional road leading north from Šmarje towards Poljčane. Historically it is part of the Styria region. The municipality is now included in the Savinja Statistical Region.

References

External links
Topolovec at Geopedia

Populated places in the Municipality of Šmarje pri Jelšah